Iglesia de San Juan Bautista (San Tirso de Abres) is a church in Asturias, Spain. It was established in the 16th century.

See also
Asturian art
Catholic Church in Spain

References

Churches in Asturias
16th-century establishments in Spain